A mooncalf (or moon-calf) is a monstrous birth, the abortive fetus of a cow or other farm animal. The term was occasionally applied to an abortive human fetus.

The term derives from the once widespread superstition, present in many European folk traditions, that such malformed creatures were the product of the sinister influence of the Moon on fetal development. The earliest recorded use of the term was in 1565, referring to a human false pregnancy.

Modern usage
The term came to also refer to any monstrous or grotesque thing. Shakespeare, for instance, used the term to describe Caliban, the deformed servant of Prospero, in The Tempest.

In H. G. Wells' 1901 novel The First Men in the Moon, large creatures domesticated by the Selenites are referred to as "mooncalves."

Mooncalf is used as a derogatory term indicating someone is a dullard, fool or otherwise not particularly bright or sharp. For example, W. C. Fields in The Bank Dick (1940) advises his prospective son-in-law to avoid being a "mooncalf" by buying shares he has been conned into believing are worth much more than the proffered price.

A mooncalf is also a magical creature in the world of the Harry Potter series. It is described in Fantastic Beasts and Where to Find Them as a shy, nocturnal creature with a smooth, pale-grey body, bulging eyes, and four spindly legs with large flat feet. Mooncalves perform dances in the moonlight and are apparently responsible for crop circles. In the film of the same name and its sequel, Newt Scamander's collection of creatures in his suitcase includes a herd of mooncalves.

Wilfred Maxwell, narrator and protagonist of occultist Dion Fortune’s 1938 novel The Sea Priestess, refers several times to a mentally disabled character who falls into the sea and disappears as a "mooncalf".

This concept is also used by Christian Morgenstern in his Galgenlieder.

In Embassytown by China Miéville, the protagonist refers to two characters as "mooncalf and quite impossible."

See also
 Homunculus
 Cambion
 Changeling
 Deformity
 Maternal impression
 Astrology

References

Abortion
Folklore
Moon in culture
Obsolete biology theories
Superstitions